Phithaya Santawong (born 18 January 1967) is a Thai former footballer who played as a midfielder for Thailand in the 1996 Asian Cup.

External links
11v11.com

Phithaya Santawong
Living people
Association football midfielders
1967 births
Phithaya Santawong
Phithaya Santawong
1996 AFC Asian Cup players